Keroeididae is a family of cnidarians belonging to the order Alcyonacea.

Genera:
 Ideogorgia Bayer, 1981
 Keroeides Studer, 1887
 Lignella Gray, 1870
 Pseudothelogorgia (van Ofwegen, 1990)
 Thelogorgia Bayer, 1991

References

Holaxonia
Cnidarian families